This list includes the appointment date and performance record of current AFL Women's senior coaches. The league consists of women's teams from eight of the Australian Football League (AFL) clubs, with every state which has an AFL team, featuring at least one AFL Women's team.

Craig Starcevich, the senior coach of the Brisbane Lions since June 2016, was the first coach to be appointed in the league. Bec Goddard, the senior coach of the Adelaide Football Club since August 2016, won the inaugural premiership in the 2017 season.

Coaches
Key

Statistics are correct to the end of the 2019 AFL Women's season

See also

List of current Australian Football League coaches
List of current NRL Women's coaches

Notes

References

 
coaches